Sharana is the capital of Paktika Province, Afghanistan.

Sharana may also refer to:
Sharana District, a district in Paktika Province, Afghanistan 
Sharana Airstrip, in Sharana, Paktika Province, Afghanistan
Sharana (Hinduism), meaning "to surrender", denotes egoless surrender and refuge in Shiva, a deity of Hinduism

See also
Sharan (disambiguation)